Ingrid Seynhaeve (born Menen, 28 June 1973) is a Belgian model. In 1991, she won the Elite Look of the Year contest. Since then, she has appeared in advertisements for Guess?, Ralph Lauren, and Saks Fifth Avenue, in catalogs for Victoria's Secret, and on the covers of Elle, Amica, and Shape.  Seynhaeve has walked for fashion shows such as Michael Kors, Carolina Herrera, Nicole Miller, Elie Saab, Victoria's Secret, Bella Freud, and Bill Blass, and has been considered to be a top model.

References

External links

1973 births
Living people
People from Menen
Belgian female models
Flemish models